Christopher John Fydler  (born 8 November 1972) is a former competitive swimmer from Australia, who competed in three consecutive Summer Olympics for his native country, starting in 1992.  Fydler represented Australia at an international level from 1989 to 2000.  During his career he amassed over 20 national championships including five consecutive national 100-metre freestyle championships.  His finest hour came at the Sydney 2000 Olympics, when he was a member of the men's 4×100-metre freestyle relay team that defeated the Americans and won the gold medal in the prestigious event, alongside Michael Klim, Ian Thorpe and Ashley Callus.  It was the first time in Olympic history that the US team had been beaten in that event.

Fydler competed in the Gladiator Individual Sports Athletes Challenge in 1995.

Since retiring from swimming in early 2001, Fydler has continued to be active in the swimming and Olympic families.  He was a board member of Swimming Australia Ltd from 2006 to 2010, was a member of the FINA Disciplinary Panel in 2009-2017 and currently a member of its Ethics Panel, and is currently the President of Swimming NSW.  He was also the Deputy Chef de Mission for the Australian Olympic Team competing in 2012 London Olympics and again at the 2016 Rio Olympics.  Since 2017, Chris has also a been a board member of the NSW Institute of Sport.

For his significant contribution to Swimming in Australia over the last 30 years, Chris was awarded Life Membership of Swimming Australia in 2020.

Chris graduated from Bond University in 1997 with a BComm and Llb (Hons).  He was admitted as a solicitor in New South Wales in January 1998.  He practiced as a lawyer in Sydney from 1998 to 2003 before taking equity in a Sydney-based System Integration business Oriel Technologies. After Oriel Technologies was sold in 2016 to the Big Air Group (ASX:BGL), Chris had a short break before being appointed as CEO and then Managing Director of Tambla Ltd (formerly ComOps Ltd), a publicly listed Workforce Management software company.

See also
 List of Commonwealth Games medallists in swimming (men)
 List of Olympic medalists in swimming (men)
 World record progression 4 × 100 metres freestyle relay

External links
 Australian Olympic Committee

1972 births
Living people
Olympic swimmers of Australia
Swimmers at the 1992 Summer Olympics
Swimmers at the 1996 Summer Olympics
Swimmers at the 2000 Summer Olympics
Swimmers at the 1990 Commonwealth Games
Swimmers at the 1994 Commonwealth Games
Swimmers at the 1998 Commonwealth Games
Olympic gold medalists for Australia
Swimmers from Sydney
Australian people of German descent
Bond University alumni
World record setters in swimming
Australian male freestyle swimmers
World Aquatics Championships medalists in swimming
Medalists at the FINA World Swimming Championships (25 m)
Medalists at the 2000 Summer Olympics
Commonwealth Games gold medallists for Australia
Commonwealth Games silver medallists for Australia
Commonwealth Games bronze medallists for Australia
Olympic gold medalists in swimming
Commonwealth Games medallists in swimming
Recipients of the Medal of the Order of Australia
20th-century Australian people
Medallists at the 1990 Commonwealth Games
Medallists at the 1994 Commonwealth Games
Medallists at the 1998 Commonwealth Games